Kępa  may refer to the following places in Poland:
Kępa, Lower Silesian Voivodeship (south-west Poland)
Kępa, Kuyavian-Pomeranian Voivodeship (north-central Poland)
Kępa, Chełm County in Lublin Voivodeship (east Poland)
Kępa, Lublin County in Lublin Voivodeship (east Poland)
Kępa, Łódź Voivodeship (central Poland)
Kępa, Dąbrowa County in Lesser Poland Voivodeship (south Poland)
Kępa, Kraków County in Lesser Poland Voivodeship (south Poland)
Kępa, Płońsk County in Masovian Voivodeship (east-central Poland)
Kępa, Siedlce County in Masovian Voivodeship (east-central Poland)
Kępa, Czarnków-Trzcianka County in Greater Poland Voivodeship (west-central Poland)
Kępa, Konin County in Greater Poland Voivodeship (west-central Poland)
Kępa, Szamotuły County in Greater Poland Voivodeship (west-central Poland)
Kępa, Opole Voivodeship (south-west Poland)
Kępa, Pomeranian Voivodeship (north Poland)
Kępa, Warmian-Masurian Voivodeship (north Poland)
Kępa, West Pomeranian Voivodeship (north-west Poland)